The National Solar Mission is an initiative of the Government of India and State Governments to promote solar power. The mission is one of the several policies of the National Action Plan on Climate Change. The program was inaugurated as the Jawaharlal Nehru National Solar Mission by former Prime Minister Manmohan Singh on 11 January 2010 with a target of 20 GW by 2022. This was later increased to 100 GW by Prime Minister Narendra Modi in the 2015 Union budget of India. India increased its utility solar power generation capacity by nearly 5 times from 2,650 MW on 26 May 2014 to 12,288.83 MW on 31 March 2017. The country added 9,362.65 MW in 2017–18, the highest of any year. The original target of 20 GW was surpassed in 2018 (counting only utility installed capacity), four years ahead of the 2022 deadline.

India had a total rooftop solar installed capacity of 6.1 GW as of 30 June 2021.

Objective

The objective of the National Solar Mission is to establish India as a global leader in solar energy, by creating the policy conditions for its diffusion across the country as quickly as possible. Under the original plan, the Government aimed to achieve a total installed solar capacity of 20 GW by 2022. This was proposed to be achieved in three phase. The first phase comprised the period from 2010 to 2013, the first year of the 12th five-year plan. The second phase extended up to 2017, while the third phase would have been the 13th five-year plan (2017–22). Targets were set as 1.4 GW in the first phase, 11–15 GW by the end of the second phase and 22 GW by the end of the third phase in 2022.

The Government revised the target from 20 GW to 100 GW on 1 July 2015. To reach 100 GW by 2022, the yearly targets from 2015 to 2016 onwards were also revised upwards. India had an installed solar capacity of 161 MW on 31 March 2010, about 2 and half months after the mission was launched on 11 January. By 31 March 2015, three months before the targets were revised, India had achieved an installed solar capacity of 3,744 MW.

Year-wise targets
To meet the scaled up target of 100,000 MW, MNRE has proposed to achieve it through 60 GW of large and medium scale solar projects, and 40 GW through rooftop solar projects.

Growth of utilities installed solar capacity
The following table records the growth of the utilities installed solar capacity in India for every year of the National Solar Mission. All capacities are as on 31 March of the listed year.

Rooftop solar capacity
India had a total rooftop solar installed capacity of 6.1 GW as of 30 June 2021. The country added 862 MW of rooftop solar capacity during the first half of 2021, recording a 210% increase over the same period in 2020.

Phase 1 (2010–13)
The first phase of this mission aims to commission 1000 MW of grid-connected solar power projects by 2013. The implementation of this phase is in hands of a subsidiary of National Thermal Power Corporation, the largest power producer in India. The subsidiary, NTPC Vidyut Vyapar Nigam Ltd (NVVN), laid out guidelines for selection of developers for commissioning grid connected solar power projects in India. See JNNSM Phase 1 Guidelines. While NVVN is the public face of this phase, several other departments and ministries will play a significant role in formulating guidelines. NVVN will sign power purchase agreements with the developers. Since NVVN is not a utility, it will sell purchased power to different state utilities via separate agreements.

Technologies 
For Phase 1 projects, NVVN started with a proposal for 50:50 allocation towards solar PV and solar thermal. The latter is quite ambitious given India has no operational solar thermal projects and less than 10MW of solar PV projects. While growing at a rapid pace lately, solar thermal technologies are still evolving globally. The first batch of projects allotted for Phase 1 included 150MW of Solar PV and 500MW of Solar Thermal. NVVN issued Request for Selection document outlining criteria for selection of projects under the Phase 1. See Solar Thermal RFS, Solar PV RfS

A growing solar PV industry in India is hoping to take off by supplying equipment to power project developers. Well known equipment manufacturers started increasing their presence in India and may give competition to local Indian manufacturers. Due to generally high temperatures in India, crystalline silicon-based products are not the most ideal ones. Thin film technologies like amorphous silicon, CIGS and CdTe could be more suitable for higher temperature situations.

Solar thermal technology providers barely have a foothold in India. A few technology providers like Abengoa have some Indian presence in anticipation of demand from this mission.

NVVN Solar PV allotment process for Phase 1 
NVVN issued Request for Selection notice for allotment of capacity to Independent Power Producers (IPPs). See NVVN Solar PV RfS. 150MWs of Solar PV and 470MW of Solar Thermal were up for allotment under the first batch of Phase 1 projects. Project size per IPP was fixed at 5MW for Solar PV and 100MW for Solar Thermal projects. To avoid allocating entire capacity to a select few corporate, guidelines required no two projects to have the same parent company or common shareholders. In case of over subscription, a reverse bidding process was to be used to select the final IPPs based on lowest tariff they offer. Several hundred IPPs responded to this RfS.

The approach for reverse bidding and methodology to calculate the discount to be offered was presented by Shri Shakti Alternative Energy Ltd through a webinar on 19 October 2010 on the eve of the reverse bidding by NVVN Download presentation on Reverse Bidding by NVVN – What to Expect. The quantum of discount would depend on project site location (i.e. solar radiation), technology used, simulated energy generation, capital cost and interest cost. Multivariate analysis was carried out using key variables like capital cost, interest and the capacity utilization factor (i.e. CUF which is actual generation of the plant and depends on the location (radiation) and technology used) to calculate the levelized tariff for a target equity IRR based on which the discount to be offered can be determined.

The final 30 solar PV projects selected had bids between INR 10.95 to INR 12.75. The Solar Thermal projects selected had bids between INR 10.24 to INR 12.24.  PPAs were signed with IPPs in early January.

2014–present
In December 2014, the Government of India introduced a scheme to establish at least 25 solar parks and Ultra Mega Solar Power Projects to add over 20 GW of installed solar power capacity. The Central Government provides financial support for the construction of these solar projects. As of December 2016, the Central Government has provided in-principle approval to set up 34 solar parks across 21 states. Each power project has a minimum capacity of 500 MW.

Domestic content complaint 
Guidelines for the solar mission mandated cells and modules for solar PV projects based on crystalline silicon to be manufactured in India. That accounts to over 60% of total system costs. For solar thermal, guidelines mandated 30% project to have domestic content. A vigorous controversy emerged between power project developers and solar PV equipment manufacturers. The former camp prefers to source modules by accessing highly competitive global market to attain flexible pricing, better quality, predictable delivery and use of latest technologies. The latter camp prefers a controlled/planned environment to force developers to purchase modules from a small, albeit growing, group of module manufacturers in India. Manufacturers want to avoid competition with global players and are lobbying the government to incentivise growth of local industry.

Market responded to domestic content requirement by choosing to procure thin film modules from well established international players. A significant number of announced project completions are using modules from outside India.

US Trade Representative has filed a complaint at World Trade Organization challenging India's domestic content requirements in Phase II of this Mission, citing discrimination against US exports and that industry in US which has invested hugely will be at loss. US insists that such restrictions are prohibited by WTO. India however claims that it is only an attempt to grow local potential and to ensure self sustenance and reduce dependence

See also
 Solar power in India
 Electricity sector in India
 Solar Energy Corporation of India
 Renewable energy in India
Paramount Solar Park

References

External links
 Ministry of New and Renewable Energy website
 List of Projects Commissioned under NSM Phase II Batch I
 

Renewable energy policy
Solar power in India
Ministry of New and Renewable Energy
Manmohan Singh administration
Modi administration
2010 establishments in India
Indian missions